Schools in the Tasmanian public education system include 138 primary schools (Kindergarten to Grade 6),  
57 high schools (Grade 7 to 10), and 8 colleges (Grade 11 and 12).  The public education system is run by the Tasmanian Department of Education.

Of the high schools, 26 are district (or district high) schools, where in rural areas the primary and high schools are located on a single campus. There are also 8 support (or special) schools, 4 early learning centres, 1 infant school and distance education.

The largest public education institute in Tasmania is the University of Tasmania, with major campuses at Newnham (in Launceston) and Sandy Bay (in Hobart), along with a north-west centre in Burnie.

There are many non-government schools and colleges in Tasmania. Non-government schools generally have a religious affiliation, although the strength varies between schools. 
There are 70 registered non-government schools in Tasmania.

Government schools

Colleges

High schools

District schools

Primary and infant schools

Support schools

Early learning schools

Non-government schools

Catholic schools

Secondary, College and K-10/12 schools

Primary schools K-6

Independent schools

Secondary and K-12 Schools

Primary schools

Closed schools

Government schools

High schools
Bridgewater High School merged into Jordan River Learning Federation Middle School/Jordan River Learning Federation Senior School in 2011
Claremont High School – merged into Montrose Bay High School
Geilston Bay High School – closed in December 2013
Penguin High School – merged into Penguin District School in 2014
Ravenswood High School
Rokeby High School – renamed Bayview Secondary College 
Rosetta High School –  merged into Montrose Bay High School

Primary and district schools
Abbotsfield Primary School – merged into Austins Ferry Primary School and Windermere Primary School
Acton Primary School – merged into Romaine Primary School in 2011
Branxholm Primary School – merged into Winnaleah District High School in 2011
Brent Street Primary School – merged with Glenorchy Primary School
Bridgewater Primary School – merged into East Derwent Primary School and Greenpoint Primary School in 2011
Brooklyn Primary School – merged into Romaine Primary School in 2011
Claremont Primary School – merged into Austins Ferry Primary School and Windermere Primary School
Elizabeth St Primary School
Inglis Primary School – was renamed to Table Cape Primary School(Bowick Street Campus) 1998
Levendale Primary School – closed in December 2018 and now used as Levendale Community Centre
Mayfield Primary School – merged into East Tamar Primary School in 2013
Mornington Primary School – campus now Mackillop College
Mt Faulkener Primary School – merged into Austins Ferry Primary School and Windermere Primary School
Penguin Primary School – merged into Penguin District School in 2014
Paloona State School – closed in 1929 due to poor attendance caused by extensive bad weather. From 1930 students attended Melrose State School
Rocherlea Primary School – merged into East Tamar Primary School in 2013
Roseneath Primary School – merged into Austins Ferry Primary School and Windermere Primary School
Table Cape Primary(Bowick Street Campus) – merged into Table Cape Primary School(Gibbons Street campus) 2009
Upper Burnie Primary School – merged into Romaine Primary School in 2011
Waratah Primary School –  merged with Ridgley Primary School 2009 (?)
West Somerset Primary School – merged with Somerset Primary School and remained in the same place, While Somerset Primary closed its other site 2010
Wynyard Primary School – was renamed to Table Cape Primary School (Gibbons Street Campus) 1998

Non-government schools

Catholic schools
Holy Name College – now part of Dominic College 
Marian College – now part of St Patrick's College
Mary Mackillop College – sister schools with Dominic
Our Lady Help of Christians Catholic Primary School – now part of St Finn Barr's Catholic Primary School
Sacred Heart College, Launceston – now part of St Patrick's College and Sacred Heart School, Launceston
Savio College – now part of Dominic College 
Shaw College, Devonport - merged with St Brendan College to form St Brendan-Shaw College
St Brendan College, Devonport - merged with Shaw College to form St Brendan-Shaw College
St Joseph's College, Hobart – now part of Mount Carmel College
St. Peter's School, Hobart – now part of St Virgil's College 
St Thomas More's College – now part of St Patrick's College and St Thomas More's School

Independent schools
Broadland House, Church of England Girls' Grammar School – now part of Launceston Church Grammar School
Clemes College – now part of The Friends' School
Capstone College (Alternative) - Closed February 2022
Horton College – parts used for The Hutchins School and Scotch Oakburn College
Launceston Steiner School
Methodist Ladies College/Oakburn College – now part of Scotch Oakburn College
Scotch College – now part of Scotch Oakburn College 
St David's Kindergarten 
Tasmanian Christian Academy

See also 

 Lists of schools in Australia
 Education in Tasmania

References

External links 
 University Of Tasmania
 The Association of Independent Schools of Tasmania
 Christian Schools Tasmania
 Schools Registration Board Tasmania

Lists of schools in Australia

Schools